Maritzburg College is a semi-private English-medium high school for boys situated in the city of Pietermaritzburg, in KwaZulu-Natal, South Africa. It was founded in 1863 and it's the oldest boys' high school in KwaZulu-Natal – and one of the oldest schools in South Africa. It is attended by 1 265 students, of whom approximately 470 are boarders.

Once renowned in the main for its rugby and strongly traditional ethos, Maritzburg College continues to attain a 100% pass rate in the annual National Senior Certificate results, and since the start of the 21st Century has added strong cultural and pastoral programmes, including a jazz band and vigorous inter-house programme. With (amongst others) 28 rugby teams, 22 cricket teams, 19 basketball teams and 18 hockey teams, the school continues to offer its long-established, vigorous sporting programme too. In December 2022, alumni Jared Campbell and Angelo Walstroom earned their international sporting colours for hockeys 5s - in doing so, becoming the school's 321st and 322nd sporting internationals.

History

Victorian origins

Maritzburg College was founded as the Pietermaritzburg High School in 1863, by William Calder, in a carpenter's shop in what is today Langalibalele Street, to accommodate the influx of children arriving at the new city of Pietermaritzburg and its surrounding farmlands in the KwaZulu-Natal Midlands. As the school - commonly known as 'College' - swelled, "the best-trained [architect] in the Colony", PM Dudgeon, was commissioned to design – on the then outskirts of the city – a larger classroom and boarding block, which was completed in 1888 and later became known as 'Clark House', honouring the school's third headmaster, RD Clark (MA (Oxon)), who is often referred to as ‘the Father of College’. Clark House carries the KwaZulu-Natal provincial heritage authorities' seal certifying it as a heritage landmark. A similar honour was bestowed on the school's Victoria Hall, the building of which commenced in 1897 (Queen Victoria's diamond jubilee year) and which served as a British Army hospital from November 1899 until July 1900 during the Second Boer War.

Headmasters

Since the school's foundation in 1863, the following 15 men have held the post of headmaster of Maritzburg College:

Calder, William, (Edinburgh Training College), 1863-1867
Forder, James, BA (Cantab), 1868-1878
Clark, Robert D, MA (Oxon), 1879-1902
Barns, Ernest W ('Pixie'), MA (London), 1902-1925
Pape, Septimus W, MA (Oxon), 1926-1937
Snow, John H ('Froggy'), BA Hons (London), 1937-1941
Hudson, John W ('John-Willie'), BA (NUC), 1941-1953
Fuller, Raymond E ('Bones'), BA, 1954-1965 *
Commons, Hector J, MA (South Africa), 1966-1977 *
Olivier, Keith, BA UED (Natal), 1978-1985 *
Forde, R Dudley, MA (Natal), 1986-1992
Elliott, Kenneth P, BA BEd (Natal), 1992-2002 *
Pearson, Clive E, BA UED (Rhodes), 2003-2005
Jury, D Ronald, BSc UED (Natal), 2006-2012
Luman, Christopher J, MED (UNISA) BA HDE (UCT) PGDip Sport Management (Massey), 2013-

School crest, colours and motto

The school crest is a red shield with a crossed carbine and assegai (a traditional Zulu weapon), over the Latin scroll bearing  (For Hearth and Home).

The college colours of red, black and white were first introduced in 1891 by the captain of the school's football team, EJ Holgate. A short while later, Mr RD Clark instituted the school motto (derived from the Latin inscription he composed for the Colonial War Memorial, now in the foyer of Clark House) and the badge of carbine-and-assegai, both of which were initially connected more with the school's Old Boys' Association than the school. An ardent Victorian, Mr Clark was especially proud that 11 of his young school's sons had perished in the valiant (as he saw them) colonial struggles 'for hearth and home' (the motto) – hence the school's martial insignia too. Notably, 7 alumni had perished at the bloody Battle of Isandlwana, and two of the school's most prized artefacts are assegais that had been retrieved from the battlefield in June 1879 presented to the school, respectively, in 2018 and 2022.

Debate has taken place as to why Holgate chose the combination of red, black and white for the school's colours. A popular belief is that they highlight the various skirmishes, battles and wars between the British and the Zulu that took place in the late 19th century (especially Isandlwana), with the colours representing the warring parties (white and black) and the blood that was shed between them (red).

Houses
Although Maritzburg College had been a boarding school since not long after its foundation in 1863, the school's system of sports Houses was only introduced in 1902. Initially, a system of four Houses was introduced, with a fifth House – Nathan House – being introduced in 1910. The old Houses were as follows:

Clark's, named after the third headmaster, RD Clark (headmaster 1879–1902)
Stalker's, named after Clark's long-serving senior assistant master, Rev John D Stalker (staff 1881–1902)
Langley's, named after Stalker's successor, AS 'Madevu' Langley (staff 1897–1909)
Oxland's, named after an early Games Master at the school, Mr W Oxland (staff 1901–1908)
Sir Matthew Nathan House – or simply Nathan's – after the last governor of Natal, Sir Matthew Nathan

The old House system of five sporting Houses was replaced in 2014 with ten new so-called 'day' Houses, each of which meet every morning, have about 130 boys, and form the basis of the school's strong mentoring programme. The Houses are now as follows:

Calder's, named after the first headmaster, William Calder
Forder's, named after the second headmaster, James Forder
Barns''', named after the fourth headmaster, Ernest BarnsPape's, named after the fifth headmaster, Septimus PapeSnow's, named after the sixth headmaster, John SnowFuller's, named after the eighth headmaster, Raymond FullerCommons', named after the ninth headmaster, Hector CommonsLamond's, named after former Vice Principal, SE Lamond (staff 1911–1950)Nicholson's, named after former Deputy Headmaster and distinguished rugby coach, JM Skonk Nicholson (staff 1944–1982)Strachan's, named after former Deputy Headmaster, JR 'Cabbage' Strachan (staff 1952–1978)

The annual inter-house competition between the 10 Houses sees them compete in over 25 academic, sports, cultural and community-based events for the Forder Cup for Champion House.

The system of day or sporting Houses is not to be confused with the school's five boarding Houses. To begin with, the sporting and boarding Houses were linked, with the boarders being allocated to Clark's and Langley's sporting Houses (and later Nathan's), and the dayboys to Stalker's and Oxland's. However, since the headmastership of Mr Snow (headmaster 1937–1941), all boys have been allocated randomly to the sports Houses. Thus, a boarder in, say, the Clark House boarding establishment might these days find himself in Nicholson's day House.

The school's five boarding Houses are:Nathan House: opened in 1910 and the home of the school's approximately 100 grade 8 (Form 2) boardersClark House: home to about 100 boys in Forms 3-5Hudson House: opened in 1958 and home to about 130 boys in Forms 3-5Elliott House: opened in 1998 and home to about 80 Form 6 boarders (originally called College House until 2013)Shepstone House'': purchased from the Shepstone family on behalf of the school in 1919 and used for many years as the school's sanatorium and for staff housing. The fifth boarding house, "New" Shepstone House, next door to the old building, was designed by Charles Taylor, the 1984 head prefect, and opened in September 2018. It houses up to 90 boarders in grades 9 to 11.

Academic standards

The school employs 105 teachers on its academic staff - in addition to scores of administrative, estates, additional sports and other support staff. The subjects offered at grade 12 level include accounting, Afrikaans, agricultural sciences, business studies, computer applications & technology, dramatic arts, economics, English, geography, engineering & graphic design, history, information technology, life sciences, life orientation, mathematics, mathematical literacy, ap maths, music, physical science, visual arts and Zulu.

Despite its size and its customary prowess on the sports field, Maritzburg College's academic standards are traditionally strong, and in recent years the school has continued to boast results that are amongst the best for a top-tier school in the country. In November 2021, all 270 of its grade 12 pupils passed the National Senior Certificate, with 89% achieving a university entrance qualification and 15 boys each earning seven distinctions.

Privileges, traditions and discipline

One of the school's distinct features is its hierarchical system, which is underpinned by a long-established set of privileges and duties.

In September 2020, Maritzburg College officially released its policy document titled 'College Culture' - aimed at outlining and preserving 'What it means to me a Maritzburg College boy', but ensuring that these practices subscribe to laws, norms and expectations. This document included a 'College Credo', which requires each boy, at the start of his career at the school, to publicly proclaim his allegiance via the 'Credo' - including his pledge to live out the school's Core Values, to 'always remain loyal and true to my school', and to live out the school's Core Traditions.

Well-known duties required of a junior include 'team-testing' (the rote-learning of school teams etc.), the requirement for him to sprint or jog in various parts of the school, 'gamesroom' (the daily sorting out of the sports equipment before practices by all 2nd Formers) and 'waiting-at-doors'. General school traditions include the wearing by all boys of straw boaters (known as bashers), which are hurled into the air at First XV rugby matches, and the saying of the word 'please' at the end of sentences when a junior is addressing a more senior boy. 

Because of its possibly contentious nature, the hierarchical system of privileges that underpins the school's ethos is monitored by the school's executive committee, in consultation with the Old Boys' Association.

Maritzburg College's structure of traditions and concepts date back to similar styles found in traditional British boarding schools, and it is perhaps one of the few schools in South Africa where this structure is retained to something like its original extent.

However, a number of its more vigorous customs have long-since been done away with – including 'wooden spoon' (a practice requiring the consumption by Form 5 boarders of mouldy food, especially prepared for them by the departing 6th Formers), 'appie stakes' (when, again, Form 5 boarders were used as jockeys by their outgoing 6th Form counterparts, invariably with painful consequences), 'domp' (a rough form of backyard rugby that was played especially when the fields were muddy), 'tables' (the serving of a 2nd Form boarder of his seniors at meal-times), the annual new boys’ concert,  and the regular caning of boys by prefects and masters. 'Running' (the carrying out of any errands by 2nd Form boys for prefects) and 'fagging' (a watered-down version of the old Victorian custom) were done away with in 2020.

Sport

The first recorded sports match played by the then Pietermaritzburg High School was a cricket match held in the Market Square on 6 May 1865 against the Red Rover Cricket Club. The High School won the first match - "notwithstanding the primitive conditions under which it must have been played" 

The first inter-schools cricket and rugby matches were both played against the Deutsche Schule Hermannsburg, on 6 October 1870, with the then High School (now Maritzburg College) winning both fixtures. The cricket match was played in the morning on the Camp Grounds and the rugby match was played in the afternoon on the Pietermaritzburg market square.

Maritzburg College offers a wide variety of sports, including rugby, cricket, canoeing, hockey, athletics, swimming, water polo, tennis, shooting, football (soccer), basketball, cross-country, squash, esports and golf.

The school has fixtures against its rival schools. Records show College to be the strongest sporting school in the province in sports such as rugby, cricket, canoeing, polo, polocrosse, and hockey.

The school's search for greater sporting competition has taken it beyond the province's borders, and each year in winter it has derby days against Afrikaanse Hoër Seunskool (known as 'Affies'), Pretoria Boys High School and King Edward VII School (Johannesburg) (known as 'KES') in Gauteng, in which about 700 College boys take part.

From 1944 until 1982, the school enjoyed the services of the noted geography master and schoolboy rugby coach, the late Mr Skonk Nicholson, whose name is iconic with Maritzburg College and schoolboy rugby, and who is well respected in the South African rugby community as having nurtured many Collegians to national and international sporting fame. In his 35 seasons in charge of the First XV (rugby), his teams established a playing record of Played 504, Won 403, Drew 49 and Lost 52.

Amongst its many notable Old Boys (known as Old Collegians), it can count (as at December 2022) 322 sporting internationals, including 36 Old Collegians who have captained international sporting sides. In addition, Kevin Pietersen captained the England cricket team, Matthew Hawkins captained the USA rugby sevens team and Darian Townsend captained the USA swimming team. Four Old Collegians attended the 2004 Olympic Games, with Darian Townsend winning a gold medal as part of the world record-setting SA 4 x 100 freestyle team, and Donovan Cech winning a bronze medal in the rowing; six attended the 2008 Olympics in Beijing, and four attended the 2012 Olympics in London. Six Old Collegians, across hockey, cycling, and swimming, were included in the SA team competing in the 2018 Commonwealth Games held on the Gold Coast, Australia.

The most recent additions (as at December 2022) to the school's international honours boards in the Kent Pavilion, overlooking Goldstone's field, are Jared Campbell and Angelo Walstroom (hockey 5s), Ntutuko Mchunu (rugby), Bradley Robinson (lawn bowls), Bandile Shandu (football) and Bradley Sherwood (hockey).

Saturdays during the summer months can often yield 30 cricket teams (an under 14P XI has occasionally been produced), and up to 29 rugby teams and 21 hockey teams during winter.

Old Collegians

Prominent Old Collegians (OCs)

Maritzburg College has produced many Old Boys who have distinguished themselves.

The details of the prominent (non-sporting) OCs are displayed on the 'honoris causa' honours board in the Victoria Hall.

Amongst the names on display are a pre-eminent English author, two bishops and 13 South African senators; a Chief Justice of old Natal, three Attorneys General and 10 judges (including a former member of the Supreme Court of Appeal in Bloemfontein); the general officers commanding the Rhodesian Army and the South African Air Force; five other generals, two admirals and the Commissioner of the British South Africa Police (BSAP) in the former Rhodesia; eight Officers Commanding of the Natal Carbineers alone; 23 Rhodes scholars and scores of academics of distinction, including professors at Harvard and Yale; two Chancellors of the University of Natal and three Directors of Education; numerous Members of Parliament; two Emmy Award-winning cameramen and a winner of the Polar Medal; as well as the founder of Rand Merchant Bank and subsequent CEO of FirstRand Bank and the current CEO of Nedbank.

The most recent (2019-2022) names added to the 'honoris causa' honours board are Major Hugh Gordon NOURSE (RE) (1899), Military Cross; Lt Croye Rothes PITHEY (RFC) (1908), Distinguished Flying Cross and Bar; Francois Adrianus RODGERS (1980), Member of Parliament, Provincial Chairman of the Democratic Alliance; Edmund BOURKE (c1864), Mayor of Pretoria; Dale Anson HANCOCK (1988), Emmy Award-winning filmmaker; and Sgt-Maj (retd.) Michael Steven BOND (1978), Member of Parliament.

The details of the prominent sporting OCs are displayed on an honours board in the Kent Pavilion.

As already mentioned, college has produced locally and internationally acclaimed sportsmen, with a tally of 321 international sportsmen and officials to date, and as such is amongst the most produced by a single South African school.

Amongst that number are 33 SA captains, 3 overseas captains, 10 captains of polo alone, a former Mr USA (bodybuilding), 6 2008 Olympians, 4 2012 Olympians, and the "man who won the 2005 Ashes" for England, Kevin Pietersen. Jesse Kriel and Ntuthuko Mchunu represented the Springboks in 2022, and 'master blaster' David Miller is a world record-holding exponent of limited overs cricket. Another well-known sportsman produced by the school is Andy Birkett, who since he matriculated at the end of 2008 has emerged as one of the world's pre-eminent marathon canoeists, having won the Dusi Canoe Marathon 12 times in the last 13 years and the world canoeing marathon title in 2022.

In addition to its 291 international sportsmen, a further 30 Old Collegians have officiated at an international level in sport - including Rugby World Cup rugby referee Craig Joubert, former Test (cricket) umpire Dave Orchard and numerous managers and coaches.

Roll of Honour

The school's Roll of Honour lists the names of 3 teachers and 261 former scholars (as at December 2022) who have given their lives in wars since the first Old Collegian casualty fell in 1873 (1863 foundation scholar, Trooper Robert Erskine, who was killed in a skirmish with the Hlubi at Bushman's River Pass). All of their names are displayed on College's numerous war memorials and honours boards, including precisely 100 on the First World War Memorial in front of Clark House and 129 on the honours board in the school chapel that records the names of Old Collegians who died in the Second World War. The most Old Collegians killed in single actions are 11 at the Battle of Delville Wood from 14 to 20 July 1916 and 7 at both the famous Battle of Isandlwana (at which over 1,300 British and colonial troops were slaughtered by the Zulus during the Zulu War – a memorial in honour of those fallen Old Boys was unveiled on the battlefield in 1969, on the 90th anniversary of that battle); and at Gelib in Italian Somaliland in 1941, during the infamous 'White Flag Incident' that claimed the lives of 13 Royal Natal Carbineers. A total of 27 alumni died at the Battle of the Somme, which was fought between July and December 1916. Three additional names to the school's war memorial commemorating its alumni killed in the South African War (1899-1902) were added on Remembrance Day 2022. Old Collegians have also earned a considerable tally of decorations and awards, especially during the two World Wars – the most recent award being the Distinguished Flying Cross awarded in 2012 to Fl Lt LD Flemington, RAF.

Notable Old Collegians (by year of matriculation)

 
 
 
 
 
 
 
 
 
 
 
 
 1952: Keith Oxlee, South Africa national rugby team player
 
 
 
 
 
 
 
 
 
 
 
 
 
 
 
 
2002: Peter Grant (rugby union), South African national rugby player
2003: Craig Burden, rugby player
 
2006: Lunga Shabalala, Actor & TV presenter

Notes

References

External links
 
 Old Boys' Association official site

Boarding schools in South Africa
Schools in KwaZulu-Natal
Educational institutions established in 1863
Boys' schools in South Africa
1863 establishments in the Colony of Natal
Buildings and structures in Pietermaritzburg